Edward Charles "Chuck" Bassett (1921–1999) was an American architect based in San Francisco.

History 
Edward Charles Bassett was born on September 12, 1921 in Port Huron, Michigan. Between high school and college Bassett worked for his father’s architectural firm. Bassett earned his B.S. in Architecture from the University of Michigan Ann Arbor. He continued his education at Cranbrook Academy of art in Bloomfield Hills, Michigan, earning a Master of Art in Architecture in 1951.  Bassett was a Fellow at the American Academy in Rome in 1970. 

He served as design partner in the San Francisco office of Skidmore, Owings and Merrill for 26 years, from 1955 through his retirement in 1981. He was elected into the National Academy of Design as an Associate member in 1970, and became a full member in 1990.

He died at age 77, from complications from a stroke only days prior.

Bassett's designs include:

 Oakland–Alameda County Coliseum, Oakland, California, 1962–1966
 El Paso Energy Building, originally the Tenneco Building, Houston, Texas, 1963
 650 California Street, San Francisco, California, 1964
 Mauna Kea Beach Hotel, Hawaii, 1965
 Bechtel Building, San Francisco, California, 1967
 Louise M. Davies Symphony Hall, San Francisco, 1980
 City Hall, Columbus, Indiana, 1981
 Southeast Financial Center, Miami, Florida, 1983
 Crocker Galleria, San Francisco, California, 1982

Honors and awards

 Arnold W. Brummer Prize in Architecture, 1963
 American Institute of Architects, Fellow, 1977
 San Francisco Arts Commission, Award of Honor for Architecture, 1985

References 

1921 births
1999 deaths
People from Port Huron, Michigan
20th-century American architects
Architects from San Francisco
University of Michigan alumni
Cranbrook Academy of Art alumni